Expeditie Robinson 2008 is the tenth season of the RTL5 and 2BE reality television series 
Expeditie Robinson. 
The show premiered on August 31, 2008. The main twist this season was that it is a 'back-to-basics' season. This was the last season to be hosted by Ernst-Paul Hasselbach as he died in a car accident on October 11, 2008 in Lom, Norway.

Contestants

Voting History

Both two finalists, won an extra positive vote, for at the final council, during the expedition.
At the final council, the eliminated contestants had to choose their winner, the votes are positive.
At the live finale, 81 contestants from previous seasons had to choose their winner, due to the equal voting by the eliminated contestants.

References

External links
Official RTL Expeditie Robinson 2008 Website

Expeditie Robinson seasons
2008 Dutch television seasons
2008 Belgian television seasons